The Carlos Palanca Memorial Awards for Literature winners in the year 2007 (rank, title of winning entry, name of author). The Carlos Palanca Memorial Awards was held on September 1, 2007.


Filipino division 
Dulang Pampelikula
First prize: Miguel G. Alcazaren (Prisoner Alpha)
Second prize: Marlon G. Miguel (Kolono)
Third prize: Renei Patricia E. Dimla (Katay)

Dulang Ganap Ang Haba
First prize: Nicolas B. Pichay (Tres Ataques De Corazon)
Second prize: Edward P. Perez (Apuntador)
Third prize: Rodolfo C. Vera (Ang Mga Huwad)

Dulaang May Isang Yugto
First prize: Christopher D. Martinez (Our Lady of Arlegui)
Second prize: Jose Dennis C. Teodosio (Baka Sakali)
Third prize: Lateya P. Bucoy (Ellas Innocentes)

Sanaysay
First prize: Annalyn L. Leyesa (Bahay-Bahayan)
Second prize:  Ma. Jovita E. Zarate (Sa Hulo't Libis Ng Aking Bayan)
Third prize: Maribel Bagabaldo-Frasure (Stet)

Kabataan sanaysay
First prize: Anna Larisa Viktoria U. Vega (Ang Huling Ngiti Ng Pagkalinga)
Second prize: Mary Anne Jelli E. Gaza (Isang Siglo, Isang Dekada't Isang Taon)
Third prize: Kathleen Teresa M. Ramos (Tatawa Na 'Yan)

Tula
First prize: Carlos M. Piocos III (Corpus)
Second prize: Rebecca T. Añonuevo (Paglingon Sa Pag-Asa At Iba Pang Tula)
Third prize: Renato L. Santos (Sosy, Atbp....)

Maikling Kuwentong Pambata
First prize: Sheila Gonzales-Dela Cuesta (Junior)
Second prize: Joachim Emilio B. Antonio (Ang Ampalaya Sa Pinggan Ni Peepo)
Third prize: Michael M. Coroza (Imibisibol Man Ang Tatay)

Maikling Kuwento
First prize: Allan Alberto N. Derain (Paputian Ng Laba)
Second prize: Jerome B. Gomez (Desperately, Susan)
Third prize: Dana Batnag (D Bampyr Chronicles...O Kwento Ng Mga Tao Sa Bayang Walang Hope)

Regional division 
Short story - Cebuano
First prize: Merlie M. Alunan (Pamato)
Second prize: Ferdinand L. Balino (Absent, Ma'am)
Third prize: Noel P. Tuazon (Kundat Sa Unang Gugma)

Short story - Hiligaynon
First prize: Peter Solis Nery (Candido)
Second prize: Felino Salem Garcia, Jr. (Sa Hingapusan)
Third prize: No Winner

Short story - Ilokano
First prize: Noli S. Dumlao (Dadapilan)
Second prize: Bernardo D. Tabbada (Ti Danapidip Nga Addang Ni Manong Rod)
Third prize: Aurelio S. Agcaoili (Alimpapatok Iti Panawen Ti Ariangga)

English division 
Full-length play
First prize: Jorshinelle Taleon-Sonza (Pure)
Second prize: Glenn Sevilla Mas (Games People Play)
Third prize: Cynthia Lapeña-Amador (The Piano)

One-act play
First prize: Debbie Ann Tan (Time Waits)
Second prize: Joshua L. Lim So (Portraits)
Third prize: Allan Lopez (Battery Park)

Poetry
First prize: Mikael de Lara Co (Hands For A Fistful Of Sand)
Second prize: José Edmundo Ocampo Reyes (Imaginary Numbers)
Third prize: Dinah Roma-Sianturi (Geographies Of Light)

Short story
First prize: Angelo R. Lacuesta (Flames)
Second prize: Douglas James Limpe Candano (Dreaming Valhalla)
Third prize: Crystal Gail Shangkuan Koo (Benito Salazar's Last Creation)

Short story For Children
First prize: Lakambini A. Sitoy (The Elusive Banana Dog)
Second prize: Dean Francis Alfar (Poor, Poor Luisa)
Third prize: Ian Fermin R. Casocot (The Last Days of Magic)

Essay
First prize: Wilfredo O. Pascual, Jr. (Lost In Childrensville)
Second prize: Rosalinda Lejano-Massebieau (Culture Shocked: A Story of Recovery)
Third prize: Allan J. Pastrana (The Lady's Train)

Kabataan essay
First prize: Cristina Gratia T. Tantengco (Humor, Faith, Bayanihan and Kayod: Survival Tools For The 21st Century Filipino)
Second prize: Juan Emmanuel P. Batuhan (Sterling Pinoy)
Third prize: Hannah L. Co (Adaptability)

References
 

Palanca Awards
Palanca